Gurudas Kamat (5 October 1954 – 22 August 2018) was an Indian politician from the Indian National Congress (INC).

An advocate by profession, Kamat was a commerce graduate from R.A. Podar College, Mumbai and has a law degree from the Government Law College, Mumbai.

He was a Member of the Parliament for the Mumbai North West constituency of Maharashtra in 2009 and Mumbai North East constituency of Maharashtra in 1984, 1991, 1998 and 2004. He served as the Minister of State for Home Affairs with additional charge of Minister of Communications and Information Technology, Government of India during 2009 to 2011. In July 2011, he resigned as minister. In July 2013, Kamat was appointed General Secretary All India Congress Committee and given charge of Rajasthan, Gujarat, Dadra and Nagar Haveli, Daman and Diu and was also appointed a member of the Congress Working Committee, the highest decision making body of the Indian National Congress. In 2014, he lost the Lok Sabha Election. In 2017, Kamat resigned from all positions that he held at the Indian National Congress. Despite his insistence on resignation the Party continued to acknowledge him as the General Secretary of AICC.

Early life, education and political career 
Kamat started his political career as a student leader in 1972. In 1976, he was appointed the President of National Students' Union of India, Mumbai Unit. In 1980 he was appointed General Secretary of Maharshtra Pradesh Youth Congress; in 1984, he was appointed the President of the Maharashtra Pradesh Youth Congress; and in 1987, he was appointed the President of the Indian Youth Congress. Kamat was appointed the President of Mumbai Congress in 2003. He held the position till 2008.

In 1982, Kamat represented the Indian Youth Congress at International Convention in Bucharest, Romania. In 1986, Kamat represented International Youth Festival in Moscow and USSR. In 2003, he was a member of the four member delegation representing India at the United Nations in New York City along with Atal Bihari Vajpayee, Inder Kumar Gujral and Farooq Abdullah. Kamat represented the Prime Minister of India, Manmohan Singh, at the UN Convention at Addis Ababa, Ethiopia.

In 1976, Kamat was awarded the Principal Wellingkar Trophy for the Most Outstanding Student Award at the R.A. Podar College and in 1979 was named a Fellow of Government Law College in Mumbai.

In 1981, Kamat married Maharookh Kamat with whom he has one son, Sunil, who is a doctor, an intensivist and a Fellow at Sloan Kettering Memorial, New York City.

Death 
Gurudas Kamat died at a private hospital in New Delhi on 22 August 2018 following a heart attack.

References

|-

|-

|-

|-

External links
 

Indian National Congress politicians from Maharashtra
1954 births
2018 deaths
India MPs 1984–1989
India MPs 1991–1996
India MPs 1998–1999
India MPs 2004–2009
India MPs 2009–2014
Indian Youth Congress Presidents
Politicians from Mumbai
Marathi politicians
Union Ministers from Maharashtra
Lok Sabha members from Maharashtra